Khan al-Baghdadi ( Ḫān al-Baġdādī) or al-Baghdadi is an Iraqi city on the Euphrates River in al-Anbar province (Hīt District). Its inhabitants are mostly Sunni Arabs.

It is the closest village to the U.S. Military's Al Asad Airbase, (formerly known as Qadisiyah Airbase when it was operated by the Iraqi Air Force). It was the site of a major battle with ISIL in February 2015. ISIS captured most of the town by 14 February 2015. On 6 March 2015, Iraqi forces managed to recapture the town from ISIL.

References

Populated places in Al Anbar Governorate
Populated places on the Euphrates River